The Journal of School Health is a monthly peer-reviewed academic journal covering the health of school students. It was established in 1930 as the School Physicians' Bulletin, obtaining its current name in 1937. It is published by Wiley-Blackwell on behalf of the American School Health Association. The editor-in-chief is Robert J. McDermott. According to the Journal Citation Reports, the journal has a 2014 impact factor of 1.434, ranking it 11th out of 37 journals in the category "Education Scientific Disciplines".

References

External links

Education journals
Publications established in 1930
Monthly journals
Pediatrics journals
English-language journals
Wiley-Blackwell academic journals
Academic journals associated with learned and professional societies of the United States